Ludvig Hedström (born 14 April 2001) is a Swedish professional ice hockey player. He is currently playing for Djurgårdens IF of the HockeyAllsvenskan (Allsv).

Playing career 
Hedström made his professional debut on 31 October 2019 playing for Djurgårdens IF away against Skellefteå AIK. He played one additional game in the SHL during the 2019–20 SHL season. He was sent on loan to Almtuna IS of the second tier HockeyAllsvenskan during the 2020–21 season, playing 16 games and scoring one point for the Uppsala-based club.
Hedström scored his first goal in the SHL in a 5–3 win on home ice against Färjestad BK on 2 November 2021.

International play
Hedström was part of the Sweden's national junior team at the 2021 World Junior Ice Hockey Championships. He played all of team Sweden's five games but did not score any points.

Career statistics

Regular season and playoffs

International

References

External links

2001 births
Living people
Almtuna IS players
Djurgårdens IF Hockey players
Ice hockey people from Stockholm
Swedish ice hockey defencemen